Barry Thomas Pullen (born 1 November 1939) is a former Australian politician. He was a minister in the Cain and Kirner Labor Victorian State Governments, and held the Legislative Council seat of Melbourne in the Victorian Parliament from 1982 to 1999. Pullen has been a member of the Labor Party since 1968, and was in the Socialist Left faction.

Pullen was born in 1939 in Melbourne, Victoria to parents Thomas Pullen, a fibrous plasterer, and Ellen Roderick. He married Margaret Ackerly, and they had three daughters. Pullen attended Moreland State School, Moreland Central School, Coburg High School. He studied at University of Melbourne and RMIT to become a civil engineer.

Pullen was a founding member of the Fitzroy Residents Association and Fitzroy city councillor 1972–1976. He was very active in campaigning against the high rise Housing Commission of Victoria flats being built in the 1950s and 1960s. He was employed as survey assistant, draftsman, technical officer, civil engineer and then Victorian director of Department of Environment, Housing and Community Development, before being elected to the Victorian Parliament in 1982.

He was Minister for Housing and Construction from 1988 to 1990. Additionally, he was appointed as Minister for Agriculture and Rural Affairs and Minister for the Arts in 1989. In 1990, he became Minister for Education, then Minister for Education and Training in 1991, as well as Minister for Conservation and Environment in 1992.

After the loss by Labor at the state election of 1992, Pullen became shadow Minister for Natural Resources and Shadow Minister for Conservation and Environment. Later, he served as shadow Minister for Conservation and Resource Management from 1993 to 1994, and shadow Minister for Environment from 1994 to 1996. He retired from Parliament in 1999, but remained active in the local community and the Australian Labour Party.

References

1939 births
Living people
Australian Labor Party members of the Parliament of Victoria
Members of the Victorian Legislative Council
Victorian Ministers for the Environment
Politicians from Melbourne
RMIT University alumni